Lipoprotein receptor-related proteins, low density lipoprotein receptor-related proteins (HGNC) or prolow-density lipoprotein receptor-related protein (UniProt), abbreviated LRP, are a group of proteins.

They include:

LRP1
LRP1B
LRP2 (megalin)
LRP3
LRP4
LRP5
LRP6
LRP8, apolipoprotein e receptor
LRP10
LRP11
LRP12

See also
 LRPAP1 (low density lipoprotein receptor-related protein associated protein 1)

Lipoprotein receptor-related proteins are co-receptors for Wnt signaling.

Human proteins
Lipoprotein receptor-related proteins are co-receptors for Wnt signaling.